Tonito Akanni Willett (born 6 February 1983) is a West Indian cricketer who played for the Leeward Islands. He is the son of Elquemedo Willett, brother of Akito Willett and the cousin of Stuart Williams. He is a right handed batsman and bowls at a right-arm medium pace.

Playing career
Willett was a member of the West Indies Under-19 cricket team in 2001 and was included in the squad for the 2002 ICC Under-19 Cricket World Cup in New Zealand, where he played alongside future West Indies cricket stars Dwayne Bravo, Darren Sammy and Ravi Rampaul.

He made his first-class debut during the 2000–01 Busta Cup for the West Indies B cricket team. His first appearance for the Leeward Islands first class team came in the same competition one year later against the Windward Islands. Willett also played domestic one day cricket for the Rest of Leeward Islands in the 2001–02 Red Stripe Bowl.

Willett also competes for his home island of Nevis in both the LICA three day and one day competitions. He was a part of the Nevis t20 team that competed at the 2006 and 2007/08 Stanford 20/20 tournaments.

References

1983 births
Living people
Leeward Islands cricketers
Nevis representative cricketers
Nevisian cricketers
West Indies B cricketers
Saint Lucia Kings cricketers